is a Japanese racing driver. He has competed in such series as Formula Nippon and Super GT.

Racing record

Complete JGTC/Super GT results
(key) (Races in bold indicate pole position) (Races in italics indicate fastest lap)

References

External links

 Official website
 Career statistics from Driver Database

1978 births
Living people
Sportspeople from Osaka Prefecture
Japanese racing drivers
Japanese Formula 3 Championship drivers
German Formula Three Championship drivers
Super GT drivers
Formula Nippon drivers
Opel Team BSR drivers
Team Kunimitsu drivers
Team Aguri drivers
Team LeMans drivers
Prema Powerteam drivers